Ban Krut station is a railway station located in Thongchai Subdistrict, Bang Saphan District, Prachuap Khiri Khan.

Train services 
 Special Express No. 43 Bangkok-Surat Thani
 Special Express No. 39/40 Bangkok-Surat Thani-Bangkok
 Special Express No. 41 Bangkok-Yala
 Rapid No. 167 Bangkok-Kantang
 Rapid No. 169 Bangkok-Yala
 Rapid No. 171 Bangkok-Sungai Kolok
 Rapid No. 173/174 Bangkok-Nakhon Si Thammarat-Bangkok
 Ordinary No. 254/255 Lang Suan-Thon Buri-Lang Suan

References 
 
 

Railway stations in Thailand